Solariella tenuicollaris is a species of sea snail, a marine gastropod mollusk in the family Solariellidae.

Description
The size of the shell varies between 4 mm and 7 mm.

Distribution
This marine species occurs off the Kurile Islands, Russia

References

External links

tenuicollaris
Gastropods described in 1998